Yaiba (stylized as Y∀IBA) is a Japanese manga series written and illustrated by Gosho Aoyama. It was serialized in Shogakukan's shōnen manga magazine Weekly Shōnen Sunday from September 1988 to December 1993, with its chapters collected in twenty-four tankōbon volumes. It was adapted into an anime television series titled Kenyū Densetsu Yaiba, aired on TV Tokyo from April 1993 to April 1994.

In 1993, Yaiba received the 38th Shogakukan Manga Award for the shōnen category.

Story

Yaiba Kurogane is an adventuring boy who knows how to be a samurai and little else. Yaiba lives with his father, Kenjurou, in the forest. One day, while Yaiba was eating, a troop of gorillas came to attack. Yaiba and his father escaped and hid inside a box, but they did not know that the box was full of pineapples and was going to be transported into the city. In the city, Yaiba finds out that he is a legendary warrior and has to fight the evil of a demonic looking high-school student named Takeshi Onimaru.

The people that Yaiba meets along his journey to become a true samurai encourage him, train him, or inspire him to greatness, though at heart he is still a child, and his incredible skill with a sword is matched only by his kindness towards his friends. Though he tends to leap before he looks, and his thick-headedness tends to turn potential allies into enemies, his friends soon clobber him, and salvage the situation. This unlikely group embarks on a host of incredible adventures where they meet legendary figures from Japanese history, and finally overcome impossible odds, and put everything on the line, to save the entire planet from a threat not of this world.

Media

Manga
Yaiba, written and illustrated by Gosho Aoyama, was serialized in Shogakukan's Weekly Shōnen Sunday from September 7, 1988, to December 1, 1993. Shogakukan collected its chapters in twenty-four tankōbon volumes, released between April 18, 1989, and February 18, 1994. Shogakukan republished the series in a 10-volume bunkoban edition from December 14, 2001, to August 10, 2002. Shogakukan launched a second edition of the original 24-volume from July 15, 2004, to April 18, 2005.

Volume list

Anime
An 52-episode anime television series covered up to the Kaguya Arc entitled , produced by Pastel, aired on TV Tokyo from April 9, 1993, to April 1, 1994. The opening and ending theme songs are performed by Kabuki Rocks;  and  respectively.

Episode list

Reception
In 1993, Yaiba, along Ghost Sweeper Mikami, received the 38th Shogakukan Manga Award for the shōnen category.

References

External links
Yaiba at Web Sunday Museum 

1988 manga
1993 anime television series debuts
Gosho Aoyama
Shogakukan franchises
Shogakukan manga
Shōnen manga
TV Tokyo original programming
Winners of the Shogakukan Manga Award for shōnen manga